Rashid Garabey oglu Mammadbeyov (28 February 1927 – 4 December 1970) was an bantamweight freestyle wrestler. He became the first Olympic medalist of Azerbaijani origin when he won the freestyle wrestling silver medal at the 1952 Summer Olympic Games.

Life 
Mammadbeyov was coached by Rza Bakhshaliyev, silver medalist of the 1928 All-Union Spartakiad, the first ethnic Azeri in the Soviet Union to carry the title of the master of sport and founder of the school of professional wrestling in Azerbaijan.

Mammadbeyov debuted in 1947 as part of the Burevestnik team of Baku in the USSR Wrestling Championship held in Tallinn, where he was placed second. He participated in 1949 championship which was held in his home town and again finished with a silver medal. In the following years, Mammadbeyov twice took part in the USSR Wrestling Championships, in 1953 and 1954, and once in the 1956 Summer Spartakiad of the Peoples of the USSR in 1956, in all of which he earned silver medals.

Mammadbeyov died in 1970, at the age of 43. Since 2009, an annual wrestling tournament is held in Azerbaijan in his memory.

1952 Summer Olympics 

Azerbaijani athletes began participating in the Olympic Games in 1952, at the same time as all other Soviet athletes, as part of a single team. The wrestling events took place between 20 and 23 July at the Töölö Sports Hall. In his weight category of under 57 kg, Mammadbeyov beat Mohammad Mehdi Yaghoubi, bronze medal winner of the 1951 World Wrestling Championships in just 32 seconds. Mammadbeyov was declared the winner of the round of 32, as his Swiss opponent Paul Hänni did not show up on the ring due to an injury. Mammadbeyov's next match with Bill Borders of the United States ended in 10 minutes and 40 seconds with Mammadbeyov's flawless victory. By the end of the round of 16, Mammadbeyov was the only athlete in this category without any penalty points. In the quarterfinals, however, he lost to the Hungarian Lajos Bence 2–1, however due to the fact that Bence had had five penalty points, he was disqualified and Mammadbeyov advanced to the semifinals. He beat Khashaba Dadasaheb Jadhav from India, but lost to Shohachi Ishii from Japan in the final, thus earning a silver medal.

References

External links
 

1927 births
1970 deaths
Soviet male sport wrestlers
Olympic wrestlers of the Soviet Union
Wrestlers at the 1952 Summer Olympics
Azerbaijani male sport wrestlers
Olympic silver medalists for the Soviet Union
Sportspeople from Baku
Olympic medalists in wrestling
Medalists at the 1952 Summer Olympics